Magool ((May 2, 1948 – March 19, 2004), born Halima Khaliif Omar, was a Somali singer.

Early years
Magool was born in the city of Dhuusamareeb the capital of the Galgaduud region in central Somalia to Cayr, Hawiye parents. She had five siblings.

In 1959, while living at the house of a cousin of hers named Mohamed Hashi, she joined a small Mogadishu-based band. Within that year, she moved to Hargeysa, where she accompanied the latter city's version of the Mogadishu-based Waaberi ensemble of musicians. It was at this point that fellow musician and songwriter Yusuf Haji Adan dubbed her Magool (meaning "flower"), a nickname by which she would come to be popularly known.

In the mid-1960s, Magool returned to Mogadishu. She then married a young general named Mohamed Nur Galaal. The marriage did not last but her popularity continued to rise.

Peak
In the 1970s, Magool sang famous patriotic songs while Somalia was at war with Ethiopia over the Somali Region.

By the late 1970s, while she still interpreted love tunes, Magool also began singing Islamic songs that criticized Somalia's then ruling military government. A self-imposed exile followed, which would last until 1987. Her concert of that year marking her return to the nation's capital, titled "Mogadishu and Magool", is to date the most successful concert in Somali history, with more than 160,000 people reportedly turning out in the city's stadium.

Magool's unique performances, ability to memorize entire albums' worth of material in a matter of hours, and her deep, emotive voice would eventually earn her the title of Hooyadii Fanka, or "Mother of Artistry."

Later years

On March 19, 2004, Magool died in a hospital in Amsterdam of breast cancer. She did not leave any children but her nephew is the famous Somali-Canadian rapper/singer K'naan.

See also
Waaberi

References
Magool songs
'A brave man doesn't need weapons'. Robin Denselow, The Guardian. Friday May 25, 2007

20th-century Somalian women singers
Somalian Muslims
1948 births
2004 deaths
People from Dusmareb
Deaths from cancer in the Netherlands
Deaths from breast cancer